The Windsor Village Church Family is a United Methodist megachurch in Windsor Village in far Southwest Houston, Texas. As of March 2020, the church's senior pastor is Suzette Caldwell. Prior to 2020, Kirbyjon Caldwell, who continues to maintain a visionary role at the church, was its senior pastor for over thirty-eight years. In 2013, the church had 17,045 members, making it one of the largest Methodist churches in the United States. The church membership is mostly black; as of 2001, the church is one of six mostly black Methodist churches in the U.S. with a membership of over 3,000 members, and one of 94 churches total with a membership of over 3,000. In 2006, it was also one of the largest black churches in the US. It reported an average weekly worship service attendance of 2,600 in 2020 (compared to 3,700 in 2018 and 2700 in 2019).

History
Up to the late 1970s, the congregation was almost all white.

In 1982, Windsor Village UMC had 25 members. Kirbyjon Caldwell became the pastor of the church that year.

In 2005, Kathy Taylor, the church soloist, and the church announced plans to record a live gospel CD.

Activities
The church has over 90 ministries. The church oversees the Imani School, a private elementary and middle school, and it is one of the church's ministries. Kingdom Builders Business Corp. serves as the church's nonprofit division. The church established nine non-profit organizations since 1982. The Power Center, is a  complex intended to promote economic growth, is one of its non-profit projects.

Leader's High School for Business and Economic Success, a Houston Independent School District charter school, was located on the church property.

Relationship with Windsor Village community
Mary Ann Fergus of the Houston Chronicle said in 2003 that Windsor Village "residents differ in their view of this neighbor. Some say the church draws nothing but traffic and that then-pastor Kirbyjon Caldwell and his staff were not as involved in the civic club as they were in prior decades. Others contend the church has always been an asset and recently improved the neighborhood via its developmental arm, Pyramid Community Development Corp."

See also

Christianity in Houston
Corinthian Pointe, Houston
History of African Americans in Houston

References

External links
Windsor Village United Methodist Church

Churches in Houston
United Methodist churches in Texas
Methodist megachurches in the United States
Megachurches in Texas